Nikolai Porfirievich Shestakov (1954 – 1977), known as The Luberetsky Maniac, was a Soviet serial killer and rapist, who worked as a truck driver.

Biography 
In 1975, he killed 12 girls and women, attempting to kill 4 others as well. All the victims were raped and killed at bus stops, struck in the head with a heavy metal object, most often a sledgehammer. Shestakov, who was in a drunken state, then stole all valuables and threw the corpses in garbage dumps. He also had two accomplices: Andrei Vladimirovich Shuvalov (born 1957), who was arrested in November 1975, and his then 16-year-old brother Vladimir. Most of his crimes were committed in the Lyuberetsky District of the Moscow Oblast, with some murders also occurring in the Balashikhinsky District.

On March 12, 1976, Shestakov was arrested by operatives while planning to commit another crime. During his detention, a sledgehammer was confiscated from him. On his clothes and in the cabin of his truck, blood samples from the victims were found. During the convoy for the trial, he managed to break out and escape, but was soon detained in an acquaintance's apartment.

During the trial, Shestakov and his accomplices could hardly save themselves from the public's lynching. In 1977, the court sentenced Nikolai Shestakov to death, while Andrei Shuvalov and Vladimir Shestakov were sentenced to 15 and 4 years imprisonment respectively. Nikolai Shestakov was supposedly executed by firing squad the same year.

By the time of his arrest, he was married and had a child (male).

In the media 
 Documentary film "Brothers by blood." from the series "The investigation was conducted..."
 Documentary film "A dragon with three heads." from the series "Legends of Soviet Detection"

See also
 List of Russian serial killers
 List of serial killers by number of victims

References

External links 

 Serial killers of Russia (Nikolai Shestakov)

1954 births
1977 deaths
Executed Soviet serial killers
Male serial killers
People executed by the Soviet Union by firearm
Soviet rapists